The 2000 Spanish motorcycle Grand Prix was the fourth round of the 2000 Grand Prix motorcycle racing season. It took place on 30 April 2000 at the Circuito Permanente de Jerez.

500 cc classification

250 cc classification

125 cc classification

Championship standings after the race (500cc)

Below are the standings for the top five riders and constructors after round four has concluded. 

Riders' Championship standings

Constructors' Championship standings

 Note: Only the top five positions are included for both sets of standings.

References

Spanish motorcycle Grand Prix
Spanish
Motorcycle Grand Prix